.Albert Woller (born November 17, 1861) was an insurance agent, real estate agent and Republican politician from Milwaukee who served two terms in the Wisconsin State Assembly from 1895 to 1898.

Notes

1861 births
Year of death missing
Insurance agents
Republican Party members of the Wisconsin State Assembly
Politicians from Milwaukee
American real estate brokers